WKTT could refer to:

WKTT (FM), a radio station (97.5 FM) licensed to serve Salisbury, Maryland, United States
WLKN, a radio station in Cleveland, Wisconsin which used the WKTT calls from 1984 to 2003
WKTT, a fictional talk radio station in Grand Theft Auto IV